Standby counsel or advisory counsel refers to a lawyer who assists a client who has invoked their right to self-representation. If the client becomes disruptive or otherwise unable to conduct his own defense, the judge may order the standby counsel to take over the defense. Standby counsel also remains available during the trial for consultation. Standby counsel was ruled to be not a violation of the defendant right to self-representation in McKaskle v. Wiggins, 465 U.S. 168 (1984).

Jack Kevorkian had standby counsel in his fifth trial.

References

Legal procedure